Venera 3 ( meaning Venus 3) was a Venera program space probe that was built and launched by the Soviet Union to explore the surface of Venus. It was launched on 16 November 1965 at 04:19 UTC from Baikonur, Kazakhstan, USSR.  The probe comprised an entry probe, designed to enter the Venus atmosphere and parachute to the surface, and a carrier/flyby spacecraft, which carried the entry probe to Venus and also served as a communications relay for the entry probe.

History

During 1965, the Central Committee, frustrated at the poor track record of Sergei Korolev's OKB-1 design bureau, reassigned the planetary probe program to the Lavochkin Bureau. In over two dozen attempts dating back to 1958, Luna 2 and Luna 3 were the only probes to complete all of their mission objectives. In the meantime, the United States had succeeded with the Mariner 2 Venus probe and Mariner 4 Mars probe, and after a long string of lunar probe failures, Ranger 6 successfully impacted on the Moon (with a failed TV system), and Ranger 7 successfully sent back a series of TV pictures.

The Lavochkin Bureau began a comprehensive testing program of the Venera and Luna probes, while Korolev had always opposed the idea of bench tests except on manned spacecraft. Among other design flaws they discovered was that the Venera landers, after being subjected to a centrifuge test, failed at half the G forces that they were supposed to handle.

Mission
The mission of this spacecraft was to land on the Venusian surface. The entry body contained a radio communication system, scientific instruments, electrical power sources, and medallions bearing the Coat of Arms of the Soviet Union. The probe was sterilised before launch.

The probe's initial trajectory missed Venus by 60,550km and a course correction manoeuvre was carried out on 26 December 1965 which brought the probe onto a collision course with the planet. Contact with the probe was lost on 15 February 1966 likely due to overheating.

The entry probe crashed on Venus on 1 March 1966, making Venera 3 the first space probe to hit the surface of another planet.

Instruments

Power system
The power system for the carrier spacecraft was notable in that it was the first operational use of Gallium Arsenide (GaAs) solar cells in space. Two two-square-meter solar panels charged the rechargeable batteries.

The entry probe was battery powered using non-rechargeable batteries

Interplanetary Bus

Non-scientific equipment 
 Transmitters and receivers at UHF frequency;
 Telemetry switches;
 System of alignment and correction station movement: micromotors, gas jets, electrooptical probe position sensors, and gyroscopes;
 Computer controller of all probe systems.

Scientific equipment 
 Three flux-gate magnetometer to measure interplanetary magnetic fields;
 Discharge counters and semiconductor detector for the study of cosmic rays;
 Special sensors (traps) to measure the flow of charged particles and determination of low energy consumption of the amounts of solar plasma flows and their energy spectra;
 Piezoelectric sensors for research micrometeorites;
 Measurement of emissions of cosmic radio in the wavelength intervals of 150 and 1500 meters and to 15 km.
The probe differed from Venera 2 in not having a micrometeorite detector.

Lander

Photometer
Gas Analyzer
Temperature, pressure and density sensors
Movement detector
Gamma Ray Counter

See also

 1965 in spaceflight
 List of missions to Venus
 Timeline of planetary exploration

References

Venera program
Derelict landers (spacecraft)
Spacecraft launched in 1965
1965 in the Soviet Union
3MV